The WNR3500L (also known as the WNR3500U) is an 802.11b/g/n Wi-Fi router created by Netgear. It was officially launched in the autumn of 2009. The WNR3500L runs open-source Linux firmware and supports the installation of third party packages such as DD-WRT and Tomato.

Hardware 

Version 1:
 Broadcom BCM4718 453 MHz SoC
 8 MB Flash memory
 64 MB RAM
 32 kB instruction cache
 32 kB data cache
 Three internal antennas
 802.11 b/g/n wireless support
 One 10/100/1000 Mbit/s WAN port
 Four 10/100/1000 Mbit/s switched LAN ports
 Integrated USB 2.0 EHCI host port
 Compatible with Windows 7

Version 2:
 Broadcom BCM47186 500 MHz SoC
 128 MB flash memory
 128 MB RAM
 32 kB instruction cache
 32 kB data cache
 Two internal antennas
 802.11 b/g/n wireless support
 One 10/100/1000 Mbit/s WAN port
 Four 10/100/1000 Mbit/s switched LAN ports
 Integrated USB 2.0 EHCI host port
 Compatible with Windows 7

Features 
There are several ways to identify the version, including a v2 label on version 2.

Version 1:
 Supports installation of  Tomato firmware and DD-WRT; the manufacturer has a custom version of OpenWrt while the mainline version works partially
 Supports Wi-Fi Protected Setup (WPS)
 Automatically detects ISP type, exposed host (DMZ), MAC address authentication, URL content filtering, logs and email alerts of internet activity
 Static & dynamic routing with TCP/IP, VPN pass-through (IPsec, L2TP), NAT, PPTP, PPPoE, DHCP (client & server)
 Supports IPv6, including automatic 6to4 tunnel (since firmware 1.2.2.30)

Version 2:
 Supports installation of  Tomato firmware (Shibby and Toastman varieties) and DD-WRT

Open source features 
According to one analysis, installing DD-WRT reduced performance.

References

External links 
 Review and Installation of NETGEAR WNR3500L Wireless-N Gigabit Open Source Router
 The WNR3500L at DD-WRT.com
 Official Product Page
 Official Support Page

Firmware downloads 
 DD-WRT for WNR3500L
 Tomato for WNR3500L
 Netgear WNR3500L Setup
 OpenWrt for WNR3500L
 Other Firmware for WNR3500L
 Netgear Firmware Update
WNR3500L
Hardware routers
Linux